Twelve teams qualified for men's rugby sevens at the 2020 Summer Olympics . Japan automatically qualified as host, with the top four teams of the 2018–19 World Rugby Sevens Series securing their spots. Afterwards, qualification was determined with each of the six continental confederations determining a representative, and the remaining qualification spot determined through an international sevens tournament.

Table

2018–19 World Rugby Sevens Series

As a principal route for the tournament, four places were determined by performance in the series over ten tournaments.

 Notes:

Africa

Rugby Africa held the 2019 Africa Men's Sevens on 9–10 November 2019 in Johannesburg, South Africa, with 2018 regional tournaments serving as a qualifier for the final tournament. Title winners Kenya gained direct entry to the Olympic Games, while Uganda and Zimbabwe progressed to the final qualifying stage. South Africa had already qualified through a top 4 finish in the World Rugby Sevens Series.

Round 1 teams
 
 
 
 
 
 
 
 
 
 
 
 
 
 
 

Pool A

Pool B

Knockout round

Asia

Asia Rugby held a tournament on 23–24 November 2019 in Incheon, South Korea. The tournament winners South Korea gained direct entry to the Olympic Games, while Hong Kong and China progressed to the final qualifying stage. Japan had already qualified for the 2020 Summer Olympics as host.

Pool A

Pool B

Pool C

Knockout round

Europe

Rugby Europe held a tournament on 13–14 July 2019 in Colomiers, France.

Teams competing in the tournament included:
 The top nine placed Olympic teams in the 2019 Moscow Sevens, with England representing Great Britain for qualification purposes
 The 2019 Rugby Europe Sevens Trophy winner and runner-up
 The 2019 Rugby Europe Sevens Conference winner

England won the tournament, meaning that Great Britain qualified for the 2020 Olympics. The second and third placed teams, France and Ireland, qualified for the inter-continental tournament for the last available slot.

Pool A

Pool B

Pool C

Knockout stage

North America

Rugby Americas North held the 2019 RAN Sevens on 6–7 July 2019 at George Town, Cayman Islands. Canada won the tournament and gained direct entry to the Olympics. The second and third placed teams, Jamaica and Mexico, progressed to the final qualifying stage to play for the last available slot. The United States qualified through a top 4 finish in the World Rugby Sevens Series.

Pool A

Pool B

Knockout stage

Oceania

Oceania Rugby held the 2019 Oceania Sevens Championship on 7–9 November 2019 at Suva, Fiji. The tournament included Japan as an invited team. Australia won the Oceania title and gained direct entry to the Olympics. As the next highest placing eligible teams not already qualified, Samoa and Tonga progressed to the final qualifying stage to play for the last available slot. Fiji and New Zealand had previously qualified through a top 4 finish in the World Rugby Sevens Series.

Pool A

Pool B

Pool C

Title playoffs

Fifth place match

South America

Sudamérica Rugby held a tournament on 29–30 June 2019 in Santiago, Chile. The tournament winners Argentina gained direct entry to the Olympic Games, while Brazil and Chile progressed to the final qualifying stage.

Pool A

Pool B

Knockout stage

Final Olympic qualification event

A 12-team repechage tournament was scheduled to be held from 20–21 June 2020, but was postponed due to the COVID-19 pandemic. Two runners-up from each of the six continental qualification tournaments played, with the winner — Ireland — advancing to the Olympic tournament.

See also
 Rugby sevens at the 2020 Summer Olympics – Women's qualification

References

 
qualification
Men